Pierre Ngayewang (born 1923, date of death unknown) was a politician from Cameroon who was elected to the French Senate in 1958.

References 
Pierre Ngayewang's page on the French Senate website 

Cameroonian politicians
French Senators of the Fourth Republic
1923 births
Year of death missing
Senators of French Equatorial Africa